The Panama City Fliers were a minor league baseball team based in Panama City, Florida, that operated in the Alabama–Florida League. They were founded in 1951 as an affiliate of the Detroit Tigers. In 1958, they were affiliated with the San Francisco Giants and they ended up as an affiliate of the Los Angeles Dodgers. The team won league championships in 1955 and 1957.

The team was moved to Andalusia, Alabama, for the 1962 season and renamed the Andalusia Dodgers. The team was then moved again mid-season to Ozark, Alabama, and renamed again as the Ozark Dodgers. The team folded after that.

From 1936 to 1939, the Panama City Pelicans played also in the Alabama–Florida League.

Notable alumni

Baseball Hall of Fame alumni

Bobby Cox (1961) Inducted, 2014

Notable alumni

Jimmy Bloodworth (1935)

Ken Chase (1935)

Roy Hartsfield (1960)

 Bob Johnson (1955)

External links
 Baseball Reference
 Historical chart of Alabama–Florida League
 The history of Alabama–Florida League and Class D leagues of Florida, Alabama, & Georgia

Defunct minor league baseball teams
Los Angeles Dodgers minor league affiliates
San Francisco Giants minor league affiliates
Washington Senators minor league affiliates
Detroit Tigers minor league affiliates
Defunct Alabama-Florida League teams
Defunct Georgia-Florida League teams
Professional baseball teams in Alabama
Defunct baseball teams in Florida
Baseball teams established in 1935
Baseball teams disestablished in 1962
1935 establishments in Florida
1939 disestablishments in Florida
1951 establishments in Florida
1962 disestablishments in Alabama